Djihad Bizimana (born 12 December 1996) is a Rwandan professional footballer who plays as a defensive midfielder for Belgian club Deinze.

Professional career
Bizimana is a youth product of Etincelles since the age of 15, and began his career with Rayon. On 26 April 2018, Bizimana joined Waasland-Beveren from the Rwandan club APR. Bizimana made his professional debut for Waasland-Beveren in a 2-2 Belgian First Division A tie with S.V. Zulte Waregem on 28 July 2018.

On 28 May 2021, he agreed to join Deinze in the Belgian First Division B.

International career
Bizimana is a youth international for Rwanda. Bizimana debuted for the Rwanda national football team in a 2-0 friendly loss to Zambia on 29 May 2015.

International goals
Scores and results list Rwanda's goal tally first.

Honours
 Rwanda National Football League (1): 2015-16
Rwanda
CECAFA Cup runner-up:2015

References

External links
 

1996 births
People from Gisenyi
Living people
Rwandan footballers
Rwanda under-20 international footballers
Rwanda international footballers
Association football midfielders
APR F.C. players
S.K. Beveren players
K.M.S.K. Deinze players
Belgian Pro League players
Challenger Pro League players
Rwandan expatriate footballers
Expatriate footballers in Belgium
Rwandan expatriate sportspeople in Belgium
Rwanda A' international footballers
2016 African Nations Championship players
2018 African Nations Championship players